ʻAbd al-Salām ibn Mashīsh al-ʻAlamī (b. ?–1227), was a Moroccan Sufi saint who lived during the reign of the Almohad Caliphate.

Biography 
Virtually nothing is known about him except that he was assassinated in 1227/1228 by the anti-Almohad rebel Ibn Abi Tawajin.

His genealogy was traced through several ancestors—some of them with typically Berber names—all the way to the Prophet of Islam, Muhammad. It is said that he was born to the Banu Arus tribe in the neighbourhood of the Jabal al-'Alam, and that at the age of 16 he travelled to the east to study. On his return, in Bijaya (Béjaïa), he followed the instructions of the Andalusian mystic Abu Madyan. He come back to stay in his native country, where he withdrew to the mountain to live an edifying life as an ascetic. He was the spiritual guide (murshid) of Abu-l-Hassan ash-Shadhili, his only disciple. his descendants lived in Fes for hundreds of years and are from the ancient Fessi Yemlahi alami Family. Most of them left fes and currently reside in Tangier and Tetouan in Morocco today.

Works 
He is the author of a collection of reflections about religious and political life in his time, and of a famous eulogy of the Prophet Mohammed (taṣliyah) on which a commentary was written by Ahmad ibn Ajiba. He also wrote a metaphysical paraphrase of a widely known prayer, called al-Salat al-Mashishiyah, in which the believer calls on God to bless the Prophet to thank him for having received Islam through him. In it, Ibn Mashish sees in the Prophet Muhammad as a person of the one Spirit from which all revelation comes and which is the eternal mediator between the ungraspable God and the world.

Notes
Muhammad Bennani, Mulay Abd Es Selam El Machich, ed. by África Española – Madrid, 1913 (In Spanish)
Titus Burckhardt, "The Prayer of Ibn Mashish", Studies in Comparative Religion, Winter-Spring, 1978, Pates Manor, Bedfont, Middlesex
Titus Burckhardt, "The Prayer of Ibn Mashish (As-Salat al-Mashishiyah)", Translation and commentary, Islamic Quarterly, London, 1978, vol. 20-21-22, no3, pp. 68–75

References

1227 deaths
Shadhili order
People from the Almohad Caliphate
Moroccan Sufi writers
12th-century Moroccan writers
13th-century Moroccan writers
Moroccan religious leaders
Sufis
Muslim saints
Sufi saints